Joseph Goldstein may refer to:

 Joseph Goldstein (legal scholar) (1923–2000), American legal academic
 Joseph Goldstein (writer) (born 1944), Buddhist teacher and writer
 Joseph I. Goldstein (1939–2015), American engineer
 Joseph L. Goldstein (born 1940), Nobel Prize–winning biochemist
 Joe Goldstein (1927–2009), New York City sports publicist
 Yossi Goldstein (born 1947), Israeli historian